Saint Amunia of San Millán was a Benedictine hermit, from what is currently the La Rioja province in Northern Spain.  She became a hermit after the death of her husband, following her daughter, St. Áurea, who was also a hermit.  Both saints spent their contemplative lives at the Monastery of San Millán de la Cogolla in La Rioja.  Amunia's feast day is March 11.

References 

Year of birth unknown
1069 deaths
Benedictine beatified people
Spanish beatified people
Spanish hermits
Spanish Roman Catholic saints
Medieval Spanish saints
11th-century people from the Kingdom of Pamplona
Female saints of medieval Spain
11th-century Christian saints
11th-century Spanish women